Frluga (in older sources also Ferluga) is a small settlement in the Gorjanci Hills in the Municipality of Krško in eastern Slovenia, close to the border with Croatia. The area is part of the traditional region of Lower Carniola. It is now included in the Lower Sava Statistical Region.

Name
Frluga was attested in historical sources in 1407, 1449, and 1507 as Verlug.

Church
The local church is dedicated to Saint Catherine and belongs to the Parish of Sveti Križ–Podbočje. Its shape indicates Romanesque origins, but the church was rebuilt in 1647.

References

External links
Frluga on Geopedia

Populated places in the Municipality of Krško